The year 1674 in music involved some significant events.

Events
 April – Thomas Shadwell produces a revision of the Dryden/Davenant version of Shakespeare's The Tempest. Furnished with music by John Bannister, Giovanni Battista Draghi, Pelham Humfrey, Pietro Reggio, and Matthew Locke, it became a great popular success.
September 29 – Nicholas Staggins is appointed Master of the Kings Music
Johann Aegidius Bach is appointed organist at the Kaufmannskirche in Erfurt
John Blow is appointed Master of the Children of the Chapel Royal
Johannes Voorhout paints the only known portrait of Dieterich Buxtehude.
Giovanni Paolo Colonna becomes chapelmaster at Bologna.
, by Robert Cambert, is one of the first French operas to be sung in Britain.

Published popular music

Classical music
Heinrich Biber 
Missa Christi resurgentis à 20
Mystery (Rosary) Sonatas
Dieterich Buxtehude
Fried- und Freudenreiche Hinfarth, published in Lübeck (consisting of Mit Fried und Freud, composed 1671, and Klag-Lied)
Klag-Lied: Muß der Tod denn auch entbinden, chorale settings
Drei schöne Dinge sind, BuxWV 19
Cristofaro Caresana
La caccia del toro
La Veglia
 Marc-Antoine Charpentier
 Laudate Dominum, H.159
 Domine Dominus noster, H.163
 Pour Ste. Anne, H.315
Francesco Corbetta – La Guitarre Royalle
Carolus Hacquart – Cantiones sacrae, Op.1
Bishop Thomas Ken – "Morning Hymn" (based upon Psalm 108.2)
Maria Francesca Nascimbeni – Mottetto Sitientes venite
Pavel Josef Vejvanovský – Sonata Natalis (composed for the Christmas season)
Gaspar Sanz – Instrucción de Música

Opera
Jean-Baptiste Lully – Alceste

Births
January 9 – Reinhard Keiser, opera composer (died 1739)
July 11 or July 16 – Isaac Watts, the "father of English hymnody" (died 1748)
September 29 – Jacques-Martin Hotteterre, composer (died 1763)
November 23 – Pierre Dumage, organist and composer (died 1751)
date unknown – Ambrose Philips, poet and lyricist (died 1749)
probable – Jeremiah Clarke, composer (suicide 1707)

Deaths
January 12 – Giacomo Carissimi, composer (born 1605)
February 22 – John Wilson, theatre composer (born 1595)
February 24 – Matthias Weckmann, composer (born c.1616)
July 14 – Pelham Humfrey, English composer and singer (born 1647)
October 15 – Robert Herrick, poet and lyricist (born 1591)
October 27 – Hallgrímur Pétursson, hymnist (born 1614)
November 8 – John Milton, poet and lyricist (born 1608)
date unknown 
Francisco Lopez Capillas, composer and chapelmaster of Mexico Cathedral (born 1608)

References

 
17th century in music
Music by year